La Femme Nikita, also called Nikita in France, is a 1990 action thriller film written and directed by Luc Besson. The film stars Anne Parillaud as the title character, a teen criminal who is convicted and sentenced to life imprisonment for murdering policemen during an armed pharmacy robbery. Her government handlers fake her death and recruit her as a professional assassin. After intense training, she starts a career as a killer, where she struggles to balance her work with her personal life. She shows talent at this and her career progresses until a mission in an embassy goes awry.

Nikita was commercially successful, but received mixed reviews from critics. It was remade as Black Cat (1991) in Hong Kong , Point of No Return (1993) in Hollywood, and in Bollywood as Kartoos (1999). Two television series were produced based on the film, La Femme Nikita (1997–2001) and Nikita (2010–2013).

Plot

Nikita is a nihilistic teenage junkie who commits her life to anarchy, drugs and violence. One night, she participates in the robbery of a pharmacy owned by a friend's parents. The robbery erupts into a gunfight with local police, and her accomplices are killed. Suffering severe withdrawal symptoms, she murders a police officer. Nikita is arrested, tried, and convicted of murder, and is sentenced to life in prison.

In prison, government officials fake her death, making it appear that she has committed suicide, and remove her from prison. She awakens in a nondescript room, where a well-dressed, hard-looking man named Bob tells her that, although officially dead and buried, she is in the custody of a shadowy government agency known as "the Centre" (possibly part of the DGSE). She is given the choice of becoming an assassin, or of occupying "row 8, plot 30", her fake grave. After some resistance, she chooses the former and gradually proves to be a talented killer. She is taught computer skills, martial arts, and firearms. One of her trainers, Amande, transforms her from a degenerate drug addict to a beautiful femme fatale. Amande implies that she also was rescued and trained by the Centre.

Nikita's initial mission, killing a foreign diplomat in a crowded restaurant and escaping from his well-armed bodyguards to the Centre, doubles as the final test in her training. She graduates and begins life as a sleeper agent in Paris (under the name Marie). After meeting Marco in a supermarket, the two develop an intimate relationship, although he knows nothing of her real work. Marco is curious about her past and why she has no family or other friends. Nikita invites Bob to dinner as "Uncle Bob". He tells stories about "Marie"'s imaginary childhood and give the couple tickets for a trip to Venice, purportedly as an engagement gift.

Nikita and Marco go on the trip. As they prepare to make love after arrival, the phone rings. She thinks it's the room service they just ordered, but it is instructions for her next job. Her room is perfectly located for her to shoot the target. She goes to the bathroom, supposedly to take a bath, and as she prepares the rifle, Marco tries to talk to her through the door. The instructions about her target take longer than expected and she can't answer him. She finally shoots her target but barely conceals the rifle before Marco walks in, against her wishes. Nikita is distraught that her work has caused them difficulties.

Still, her career as an assassin goes well until a document-theft mission in an embassy goes awry. The Centre sends in Victor "The Cleaner", a ruthless operative, to salvage the mission and destroy all the evidence of the foul-up. When another operative is killed by Victor, Nikita is assigned to take his place. They nearly complete the mission before it goes bad. Victor takes on a bunch of guards before being fatally wounded, but drives Nikita to safety before succumbing to his wounds.

Marco reveals that he has discovered Nikita's secret life, and, concerned over how her activities are affecting her psychologically, persuades her to disappear. Upon discovering that she abandoned the Centre, Bob goes to their apartment and meets with Marco. When Bob says that Nikita is at risk because she still has the documents taken from the embassy, Marco hands them over. The two men agree that they will both miss Nikita.

Cast

 Anne Parillaud as Nikita
 Marc Duret as Rico
 Jean-Hugues Anglade as Marco
 Tchéky Karyo as Bob
 Jeanne Moreau as Amande
 Jean Reno as Victor "The Cleaner"
 Jacques Boudet as The Chemist
 Philippe Leroy as Grossman

Production
Based on the success of Le Grand Bleu, Gaumont agreed to finance Nikita without having seen a script. Nikita cost 39 million francs to make, and was a co-production between Besson's company Les Films du Loup, Gaumont, and Cecchi Gori Group Tiger Cinematographica.

Release
Nikita premiered in Paris at the Grand Rex on 21 February 1990. On its first week in Paris, the film had 113,900 spectators. By the year 2000, the film had 828,867 spectators in Paris.

Following the premiere, the film was distributed to 15 towns in France,  with Besson to promote it and have discussions with audiences after the screenings. Other cast and crew members on the tour included Éric Serra, Anne Parillaud, Jean-Hugues Anglade and occasionally Tchéky Karyo. The film had 3,787,845 spectators in France by 2000. It was the fourth highest-grossing film in France for 1990, but was not as popular as Besson's previous film The Big Blue (1988).

After Nikita'''s release in France, it was released in over 95 countries. Gaumont handled the sales of distribution rights separately; distribution rights were sold to Columbia Pictures and the remake rights were sold to Warner Bros. Nikita was shown in Montreal, Canada in 1990. The film was very popular in Montreal, where distributor Didier Farre noted that the film was beaten only by Bird on a Wire and Back to the Future Part III in June 1990. In Britain, the film became the highest weekly box office ever for a French film, and it was also popular in the box office in Italy and Japan.

It was released in the United States in 1991. The film had a six-month theatrical run in the United States where it reached an audience of 1.15 million. By the end of the year, the film was the third highest-grossing French film production in the United States. Besson thought that the film was inappropriately promoted in the United States, saying that "Nikita is an action film but was released in American art houses. The Big Blue has the same problem, released in the United States as an intellectual work, and attracting the wrong audience."

Reception
In France, the popular press reception to the film was mixed. Monthly film journals were more favourable, while the more serious journals were predominantly negative. Reviews from Le Nouvel Observateur, Libération, Le Figaro and Le Journal du Dimanche gave the film positive reviews, where they all appreciated Besson's film noir styled film and were surprised at Parillaud's acting in a demanding role. In contrast, the film was dismissed in reviews from L'Humanité, L'événement du jeudi, Le Monde, Le Parisien, and La Croix, who found the film resembled a commercial advertisement visually and psychologically had the depth of a comic strip.

Speaking of the film's critical reception in France, Besson noted he would not talk to the press, saying that he would want to "count on them to help me, to help me evaluate my own work". He said that "critics should be looking towards the future, but in France, all they want to talk about is the past."

Besson further said: "I don't have much belief in the sincerity of critics, I believe in the sincerity of someone who goes to a film, pays his ticket and comes out saying what he thinks because he has nothing to gain by doing so. The critics defend an ideology, their age, their profession, a lot of things that don't interest me."

Paris critic Marc Esposito of Studio responded to Besson's statements, describing Besson as someone who "thinks he's a nice guy, and everyone around him is evil. We are all guilty of not adoring Luc Besson."

The film received mixed reviews outside France. On Metacritic, the overall score from 14 critics is 56 out of 100, indicating "mixed or average reviews". However, on Rotten Tomatoes the film has an approval rating of 89% based on 44 reviews. The site's consensus states: "A zany out-of-control thriller that gives lead Anne Parillaud a big character arc and plenty of emotional room to work in". A number of critics, including Gene Siskel and Roger Ebert, positively reviewed the film.

Accolades
The film was nominated for the Golden Globe Award for Best Foreign Language Film. Parillaud won the César Award for Best Actress and the David di Donatello Award for Best Foreign Actress in 1991. Marc Duret was nominated for a César Award for Most Promising Actor for his portrayal of Rico.

Aftermath and influence
When asked about a follow-up to Nikita, Anne Parillaud said that she was not interested in a sequel. She said: "If the film was a failure, would you have had anything more to say about her? No. Of course not."

RemakeLa Femme Nikita was remade in Hong Kong as the action film Black Cat directed by Stephen Shin in 1991.

It was remade in Hollywood as Point of No Return by John Badham in 1993. This was part of a trend in the late 1980s and early 1990s for Hollywood to remake French films. Daily Variety noted that between 1987 and 1993, Hollywood remade seventeen contemporary French films, which had been released in the 1970s, 1980s, and 1990s. The remakes were generally initiated by the French films and, given the size of the American market, often make more money for their directors as American adaptations than they do as original films in France.

TV series

A Canadian TV series based on the film, titled La Femme Nikita, premiered in 1997. It was produced in Canada by Fireworks Entertainment. The developer Joel Surnow, who described himself as "devotee of Besson's film", has repeatedly said in interviews that the series is modelled explicitly after Besson's film and not the American remake. He said that he had never seen Point of No Return.

The premiere episode of the series borrows scenes from Besson's film, with Variety noting that it was a scene-by-scene re-creation of the kitchen restaurant scene. Several lead roles in the series parallel those of the film: Roy Dupuis plays Nikita's trainer Michael, who was called Bob in Besson's film, and Alberta Watson is Madeline, who is similar to the character played by Jeanne Moreau in Besson's film.

In 2010, The CW picked up a new series, Nikita, with Maggie Q as a Nikita who has gone rogue.

 Influences 
Other films that La Femme Nikita has influenced include The Villainess'' (2017), a South Korean film.

See also
 Girls with guns
 List of assassinations in fiction
 List of neo-noir films

Notes

References

Sources

External links
 
 
 
 
 
 Anne Parillaud winning her Cesar Award at the 1990 Cesar Awards on Vimeo

1990 films
1990 action thriller films
Fictional assassins
Films adapted into television shows
Films about drugs
Films directed by Luc Besson
Films featuring a Best Actress César Award-winning performance
Films produced by Luc Besson
Films scored by Éric Serra
Films set in France
Films shot in Paris
Films shot in Venice
French action thriller films
1990s French-language films
Gaumont Film Company films
Girls with guns films
Italian action thriller films
1990s Italian-language films
1990s French films